Didier Awadi is a Senegalese rapper and a significant figure in Francophone West African hip hop. As a founding member of Positive Black Soul (PBS) with Duggy Tee, Awadi toured around the world contributing to the international popularity of Hip Hop Galsen. Awadi works as a solo artist, accompanied by his crew PBS Radikal. He participates in the Senegalese music industry through his label, recording studio, and rehearsal space, Studio Sankara. Awadi offers a conscious and revolutionary style of music strengthened by articulated and rooted messages. His motivation and inspiration is grounded in the Burkinabé revolutionary Thomas Sankara's phrase: "Let's dare to invent our future!"

Biography
Born on August 11, 1969 in Dakar, Senegal, Awadi is of Beninese and Cape Verdean descent. In 1984, while hip hop was slowly emerging on the Dakar scene, Awadi created the group Syndikat. In 1989, he formed Positive Black Soul with fellow hip hop musician Duggy Tee with the desire of promoting a positive image of Africa. In 1992, PBS was chosen by the French rapper with Senegalese origins, MC Solaar, to be the first part of his show touring throughout France. With a growing popularity, they recorded in 1994 their first track "Boul Faale," ("Don't worry") in which they denounced the corruption of the local political system. This track became part of their first album, "Salaam" released in 1995 after a European tour and signed under the label, Island Records. Over the next fourteen years, PBS had multiple international collaborations (KRS-One, Mc Solaar, Princess Erika, K-Mel, Kimani Marley, etc.) and toured worldwide while releasing K7 and CD in Senegal and internationally. Throughout his career, as member of PBS and later as a solo artist, Awadi articulated a militant and critical discourse in favour of a brighter pan-African future.

In 2001, the two members of PBS decided to start a solo careers. A year later, Awadi released his first solo album, “Kaddu Gor” ("Word of Honour") which received the Radio France Internationale (RFI) World Music Award in 2003. After announcing the formation of his new crew, PBS-Radikal with Baay Sooley, Carlou D, and Noumounda Cissoko, Awadi signed with Sony Music. In 2005, he released his second solo album, “Un Autre Monde est Possible” (“Another World is Possible”) in which he called for the emergence of a better society based on equity, fairness, justice, and freedom. In 2006, he released “Sunugaal”, a plea for the development of Senegal and against illegal immigration. In October 2007, Awadi presented his upcoming project, “Presidents of Africa” on the Bataclan (theatre) stage in Paris, with artists from all over the continent. This fourth album was released in April 2010.

In 1998, Awadi began contributing to Dakar's musical industry with the creation of his first home studio, "Taf-Taf Production" ("quickly" in Wolof - but "well-done" as Awadi stresses) and the first rental of his PA system. In 2001, he produced a one-hour TV show mirroring the local hip hop culture, "Senerap". In 2003, he created a festival dedicated to the hip hop culture, "Senerap International". That same year, "Taf-Taf Production" became "Studio Sankara", a more formal and professional music production structure actively producing advertising spots. In 2009, as a joint initiative with music professionals and hip hop artists, Awadi organized the first edition of "72H Hip Hop", a three-day event celebrating Hip Hop Galsen through workshops, conferences, performances, and exhibitions.

Discography 

PBS cassettes released in Senegal between 1994 and 2001:
 Boul Falé
 Boul Falé Bou Bess
 Daw Thiow
 Fo Deuk
 New York / Paris / Dakar
 Wakh Feign
 Révolution 2000

PBS CD released internationally between 1995 and 2001:
 1995 – Salaam
 1997 – New York / Paris / Dakar (released in Europe in 2003 only)
 2001 – Run Cool

Awadi solo albums – from 2002 up to nowadays:
 2002 – Kaddu Gor
 2005 – Un Autre Monde est Possible
 2006 – Sunugaal (released in Europe in 2009)
 2010 – Presidents of Africa
 23 Avril 2018-  Made in Africa

Distinctions / Affiliations 

 2003 – RFI World music award
 2004 – Best African rapper – Tamani Awards (Mali)
 2005 – Chevalier des Arts et des Lettres – France and Senegal
 AURA (United Artists for African Rap) member and actor in the first West African hip hop musical comedy show “The Extraordinary Stories of Poto-Poto Children” in which he represents the soldier-child

Filmography 
Awadi was the subject of a film by director Yanick Létourneau, Canada, 2012
Distributed by National Film Board of Canada, WINNER - Critic's Choice Award - RIDM Festival Montreal 2011
 United States of Africa

See also 

 Hip Hop Galsen
 Positive Black Soul (PBS)
 AURA (United Artists for African Rap)
 Senegalese hip hop
 Music of Senegal
 African hip hop

References

External links

Studio Sankara official website
Didier Awadi, Official website 

French rappers
Living people
Musicians from Dakar
Sankarists
Senegalese hip hop musicians
1969 births